Delirio is a 1944 Argentine comedy film, the directorial debut of actor and director Arturo García Buhr. It was adapted from the play "Una Viuda Dificil", which was performed at the Segunda Premio Nacional de Teatro.  The film was produced by Lumiton Studios. The film stars Irma Córdoba, Rosa Rosen and Iris Portillo.

Cast
Irma Córdoba 		
Rosa Rosen 
Iris Portillo 	
Roberto Fugazot 		
Arturo García Buhr 		
Raimundo Pastore 				
Tilda Thamar 		
Juan Vítola

References

External links
 

1944 films
1940s Spanish-language films
Argentine black-and-white films
1944 comedy films
Argentine comedy films
Films directed by Arturo García Buhr
1940s Argentine films